The 2022 United States attorney general elections were held on November 8, 2022, to elect the attorneys general in thirty states, two territories, and one federal district. The previous elections for this group of states took place in 2018. The attorney general of Vermont serves two-year terms and was last elected in 2020.

These elections took place concurrently with several other federal, state, and local elections.

Partisan composition before the election 
Going into the election, there were 23 Republican attorneys general and 20 Democratic attorneys general. This class of attorneys general was made of 15 Democrats and 15 Republicans.

Republicans defended three states won by Joe Biden in 2020, while Democrats defended one state won by Donald Trump. Additionally, Democrats held attorney general offices in three states with Republican governors. By contrast, Republicans held attorney general offices in one state with a Democratic governor.

Election predictions 
Several sites and individuals published predictions of competitive seats. These predictions looked at factors such as the strength of the incumbent (if the incumbent is running for re-election), the strength of the candidates, and the partisan leanings of the state (reflected in part by the state's Cook Partisan Voting Index rating). The predictions assigned ratings to each seat, with the rating indicating the predicted advantage that a party has in winning that seat.

Most election predictors used:

 "tossup": no advantage
 "tilt" (used by some predictors): advantage that is not quite as strong as "lean"
 "lean": slight advantage
 "likely": significant, but surmountable, advantage
 "safe": near-certain chance of victory

Race summary

States

Territories and federal district

Closest races 
States where the margin of victory was under 1%:
 Arizona, 0.02%
 Guam, 0.12%
 Minnesota, 0.84%

States where the margin of victory was under 5%:
 Wisconsin, 1.34%
 Kansas, 1.68%
 Iowa, 1.71%

States where the margin of victory was under 10%:
 Georgia, 5.26%
 Delaware, 7.67%
 Nevada, 7.89%
 New York, 8.58%
 Michigan, 8.60%
 Texas, 9.76%
 Illinois, 9.95%

Blue denotes races won by Democrats. Red denotes races won by Republicans.

Alabama

Incumbent Republican Steve Marshall ran for re-election. He was challenged by attorney Harry Still III in the primary. Tarrant police chief Wendell Major, a Democrat, ran.

Marshall and Major won their respective primaries on May 24.

In the general election, Steve Marshall won re-election.

Arizona

The 2022 Arizona Attorney General election will take place on November 8, 2022, to elect the attorney general of Arizona. Incumbent Republican Attorney General Mark Brnovich is term-limited, cannot seek re-election to a third term in office and instead is running for the U.S. Senate.

Republican candidates included former assistant U.S. attorney Lacy Cooper, former Tucson city councilman Rodney Glassman, former Arizona Supreme Court justice Andrew Gould, chair of the Arizona Chamber of Commerce and Industry Dawn Grove, former Maricopa County prosecutor Abraham Hamadeh, and farmer and 2020 congressional candidate Tiffany Shedd.

The only Democratic candidate is attorney and former chair of the Arizona Corporation Commission Kristin Mayes.

In the general election, Kris Mayes barley won.

Arkansas

The 2022 Arkansas Attorney General election will be held on November 8, 2022, to elect the attorney general of Arkansas. Incumbent Republican Attorney General Leslie Rutledge won re-election on November 6, 2018, to a second term. She was term-limited and decided to announce a campaign for Governor of Arkansas in 2022 but later switched to run for Lieutenant Governor of Arkansas.

Republican candidates included Lt. Governor Tim Griffin, and Attorney Leon Jones Jr. The only Democratic candidate is Little Rock lawyer Jesse Gibson.

Griffin and Gibson won their respective primaries on May 24.

In the general election, Griffin easily won.

California

The 2022 California Attorney General election will be held on November 8, 2022, to elect the attorney general of California. Incumbent Democratic Attorney General Rob Bonta was appointed to the office on April 23, 2021, following the resignation of Xavier Becerra to become the U.S. Secretary of Health and Human Services. He is ran for a full term.

Republican candidates included attorney and business owner Eric Early and former assistant attorney general for the Tax Division Nathan Hochman.

Criminal defense attorney Dan Kapelovitz is running as the Green Party candidate. Sacramento district attorney Anne Marie Schubert is running as an independent.

Bonta and Hochman advanced from the nonpartisan blanket primary on June 7.

Rob Bonta won in the general election.

Colorado

Incumbent Democrat Phil Weiser ran for re-election. Republican John Kellner, district attorney for the 18th district court of Colorado, ran against Weiser.

Attorney Stanley Thorne originally ran as a Republican, but was disqualified. 

Weiser and Kellner won their respective primaries on June 28.

Phil Weiser won re-election.

Connecticut

Incumbent Democrat William Tong ran for re-election. Republican attorney Jessica Kordas ran against him.

William Tong won re-election.

Delaware

Incumbent Democrat Attorney General Kathy Jennings ran for re-election.

The only Republican candidate is 2020 Republican gubernatorial nominee Julianne Murray.

Kathy Jennings won re-election by under 10%.

Florida

Incumbent Republican Attorney General Ashley Moody ran for re-election.

Democratic candidates included former state attorney Aramis Ayala, Fort Lauderdale criminal defense lawyer Jim Lewis, and Santa Rosa Beach lawyer Daniel Uhlfelder.

Ayala won the Democratic primary on August 23.

In the general election, Ashley Moody won re-election with over 60% of the vote.

Georgia

The 2022 Georgia Attorney General election will take place on November 8, 2022, to elect the attorney general of Georgia. Incumbent Republican Attorney General Chris Carr was appointed to the office on November 1, 2016. He won re-election to a second full term.

He faced a primary challenge from business owner John Gordon.

State Senator Jen Jordan and lawyer Christian Wise Smith ran for the Democratic nomination. Lawyer Martin Cowen ran as a Libertarian.

Carr and Jordan won their respective primaries on May 24.

In the general election, Carr won re-election by over 5% of the vote.

Idaho

Incumbent Republican Lawrence Wasden ran for re-election, but lost renomination to former U.S. representative and former chair of the Idaho Republican Party Raúl Labrador in the Republican primary.

Lawyer Steven Scanlin was the only Democratic candidate, but withdrew after securing the nomination. Boise attorney Tom Arkoosh assumed the Democratic nomination and appeared on the November ballot instead.

Labrador and Scanlin won their respective primaries on May 17.

Raúl won the general election.

Illinois

Incumbent Democrat Kwame Raoul ran for re-election.

Republican candidates included business attorney and Republican nominee for attorney general in 2010 Steve Kim, lawyer Tom DeVore and attorney David Shestokas.

Raoul and DeVore won their respective primaries on June 28.

Kwame won re-election by 11 points.

Iowa

Incumbent Democrat Tom Miller is running for re-election.

Brenna Bird, the County Attorney of Guthrie County and Republican nominee for attorney general in 2010, is running as a Republican.

Miller and Bird won their respective primaries on June 7.

Kansas

Incumbent Republican Derek Schmidt decided to run for Governor.

The Republican candidates included former Kansas Secretary of State and 2018 gubernatorial nominee Kris Kobach, former federal prosecutor Tony Mattivi, and state senator Kellie Warren.

The only Democratic candidate is attorney Chris Mann.

Kobach and Mann won their respective primaries on August 2.

In the general election, Kobach defeated his Democratic challenger Chris Mann.

Maryland

Incumbent Democrat Brian Frosh retired.

Democratic candidates included U.S. Representative and former Lt. Governor Anthony Brown and retired judge and former First Lady of Maryland Katie O'Malley.

Republican candidates included former Montgomery County Board of Elections chairman Jim Shalleck and former Anne Arundel County councilmember and 2004 Constitution Party candidate for president Michael Peroutka.

Brown and Peroutka won their respective primaries on July 19.

Brown won the general election.

Massachusetts

Incumbent Democrat Maura Healey retired to run for Governor.

The Dmocratic candidates included former member of the Boston City Council Andrea Campbell, labor attorney and candidate for US Senate in 2020 Shannon Liss-Riordan, and former United States Department of Commerce deputy general counsel Quentin Palfrey.  

The only Republican candidate was attorney James McMahon, who was the Republican nominee for attorney general in 2018.

Campbell won the general election.

Michigan

Incumbent Democrat Dana Nessel ran for re-election.

The Republican candidates included State Representative Ryan Berman, attorney Matthew DePerno (who has been endorsed by Donald Trump), and former speaker of the Michigan House of Representatives Tom Leonard DePerno won the primary on August 2.

Nessel won re-election in the general election.

Minnesota

The 2022 Minnesota Attorney General election will be held on November 8, 2022, to elect the attorney general of the U.S. state of Minnesota. Incumbent Democrat Keith Ellison ran for re-election. He faced a primary challenge from Bill Dahn. 

The Republican candidates included perennial candidate Sharon Anderson, attorney Jim Schultz, and former state representative Doug Wardlow. Schultz won the August August 9 primary.

Ellison barley won re-election in the general election.

Nebraska

Incumbent Republican Doug Peterson retired. Republican candidates included Speaker of the Nebraska Legislature Mike Hilgers and Jennifer Hicks.

Lary Bolinger ran as a Legal Marijuana Now candidate.

Hilgers won his primary on May 10. He also won the general election.

Nevada

Incumbent Democrat Aaron Ford ran for re-election. He faced a primary challenge from Stuart MacKie. Republican candidates included attorneys Tisha Black and Sigal Chattah. John T. Kennedy was the Libertarian nominee.

Ford and Chattah won their respective primaries on June 14.

Ford won re-election in the general election.

New Mexico

Incumbent Democrat Hector Balderas was term-limited and cannot seek re-election.

Democrat candidates included Bernalillo County District Attorney Raúl Torrez, and New Mexico State Auditor Brian Colón.

Marine veteran Jeremy Gay was the only Republican candidate.

Torrez and Gay won their respective primaries on June 7.

Torrez won the general election.

New York

The 2022 New York Attorney General election will take place on November 8, 2022, to elect the attorney general of New York. The incumbent Democratic Attorney General Letitia James, who had previously declared to run for Governor, switched races and declared her intention to seek re-election. Running against her was Republican attorney Michael Henry. In the general election, Letitia won re-election by under 10%.

James and Henry won their respective primaries on June 28.

North Dakota

Incumbent Republican Drew Wrigley ran for a full term. His only opponent was Democratic attorney Timothy Lamb. In the general election, Drew easily won.

Wrigley and Lamb won their respective primaries on June 14.

Ohio

Incumbent Republican Dave Yost ran for re-election. Democratic state representative Jeffrey Crossman ran against him. In the general election, Dave Yost easily won re-election 

Yost and Crossman won their respective primaries on May 3.

Oklahoma

Incumbent Republican John O'Connor ran for a full term. He faced a primary challenge from Tulsa attorney Gentner Drummond. Drummond won his primary on June 28.

No Democrat filed to run for the office. Former Oklahoma Army National Guard officer Lynda Steele ran as a Libertarian.

Drummond won the general election.

Rhode Island

Incumbent Democrat Peter Neronha ran for re-election. Former state prosecutor Charles "Chas" Calenda ran against him as a Republican. Alan Gordon and Rebecca Lynne McLaughlin are running as independents.

Peter won re-election in the general election.

South Carolina

Incumbent Republican Alan Wilson ran for re-election. Attorney Lauren Martel challenged him in the Republican primary.

Wilson won his primary on June 14. He won re-election in the general election.

South Dakota

Incumbent Republican Mark Vargo is retired after being appointed to complete the term of Jason Ravnsborg, who was impeached and removed from office. 

On September 12, 2020, while driving home from a political fundraiser, Ravnsborg struck and killed a pedestrian, Joseph Boever. He was charged with three misdemeanors related to Boever's death—careless driving, driving out of his lane, and operating a car while using a cell phone. Ravnsborg pleaded no contest to driving out of his lane and operating a car while using a cell phone; the careless driving charge was dismissed. Several high-profile figures called for Ravnsborg's resignation, including Governor Kristi Noem.

Former South Dakota Attorney General Marty Jackley launched a primary challenge to Ravnsborg. South Dakota Division of Criminal Investigation director David Natvig also ran in the Republican primary.

Jackley won the nomination at the Republican state convention on June 25. He won the general election.

Texas

Incumbent Republican Ken Paxton won re-election to a third term. Texas does not have term limits.

Citing allegations of corruption against Paxton, Texas Land Commissioner George P. Bush has announced a primary challenge against him. Former Texas Supreme Court Justice Eva Guzman also announced a challenge to Paxton.

Paxton and Garza won their respective runoffs on May 24.

Vermont

Incumbent Republican Susanne Young retired after being appointed to complete the unexpired term of T. J. Donovan. Democratic primary candidates included Donovan's former chief of staff Charity Clark and Washington County prosecutor Rory Thibault. Clark won the primary on August 9.

The only Republican candidate is perennial candidate H. Brooke Paige. Paige dropped out of the race on August 19 and was replaced by Mike Tagliavia. 

Elijah Bergman ran as the candidate of the Vermont Progressive Party.

Clark won the general election.

Wisconsin

Incumbent Democrat Josh Kaul ran for re-election.

The Republican primary candidates included former state assemblyman Adam Jarchow, Chippewa Falls attorney Karen Mueller, and Fond du Lac County prosecutor Eric Toney. Toney won the Republican primary on August 9.

Libertarian Matthew Bughman also ran.

Kaul narrowly won re-election.

See also 

 2021 Virginia Attorney General election
 2022 United States elections

Notes

References